Harry Sharp may refer to:
 Harry Sharp (cricketer), English cricketer, cricket coach and scorer
 Harry Sharp (footballer), Australian rules footballer
 Harry Clay Sharp (1870–1940), American surgeon and eugenicist
 Harrison Sharp, Scottish football goalkeeper

See also
 Harry Sharpe (disambiguation)
 Henry Sharp (disambiguation)